Himson Teleda (born 28 August 1992) is a footballer that comes from Solomon Islands. He plays as a midfielder for Western United in Solomon Islands National Club Championship. He is a member of Solomon Islands national football team. He made his debut during the 2012 OFC Nations Cup and he scored one goal against New Zealand. In stage 3 he scored one goal against Tahiti.

References

1992 births
Living people
Solomon Islands footballers
Solomon Islands international footballers
Association football midfielders
2012 OFC Nations Cup players